Santa Blumberga-Bērziņa (born December 23, 1994 in Ventspils as Santa Blumberga) is a Latvian curler and curling coach from Jelgava.

At the national level, she is a 2019 Latvian women's champion, three-time mixed doubles champion (2017, 2018, 2019) and two-time junior champion (2012, 2015).

Teams

Women's

Mixed

Mixed doubles

Record as a coach of national teams

References

External links
 
 
 Video: 

Living people
1994 births
People from Ventspils
Latvian female curlers
Latvian curling champions
Latvian curling coaches
21st-century Latvian women